The 1983 Swiss Indoors was a men's tennis tournament played on indoor hard courts at the St. Jakobshalle in Basel, Switzerland that was part of the 1983 Volvo Grand Prix. It was the 15th edition of the tournament and was held from 10 October through 16 October 1983. Third-seeded Vitas Gerulaitis won the singles title.

Finals

Singles
 Vitas Gerulaitis defeated  Wojciech Fibak 4–6, 6–1, 7–5, 5–5, ret.
 It was Gerulaitis's 1st singles title of the year and the 25th of his career.

Doubles
 Pavel Složil /  Tomáš Šmíd defeated  Stefan Edberg /  Florin Segărceanu 6–1, 3–6, 7–6

References

External links
 Official website 
 ITF tournament edition details

Swiss Indoors
Swiss Indoors
1983 in Swiss tennis